Ross River is a rural locality in the City of Townsville, Queensland, Australia. In the  Ross River had a population of 0 people.

Geography 
The Ross River (the river) forms the western boundary of the locality. Lake Ross occupies much of the locality and is a reservoir created by the Ross River Dam across the river.

History 
The locality is presumably named after the river Ross River which is named after publican William Alfred Ross.

In the  Ross River had a population of 0 people.

References 

City of Townsville
Localities in Queensland